Eve (Japanese: いぶ; also stylized as E ve, born 23 May 1995), formerly known as Keitora (けいとら) and Kurowa (クロわ), is a Japanese singer-songwriter and Vocaloid producer. He got his start in the music industry by doing covers on Niconico.

He eventually signed to Toy's Factory in 2019, moving away from Harapeco Records. He was also a guest in "School of Lock!" by Tokyo FM.

His music has been featured as theme music for various anime such as Dororo (Dark Night / 闇夜), Jujutsu Kaisen (kaikaikitan / 廻廻奇譚), Josee, the Tiger and the Fish (Ao No Waltz / 蒼のワルツ), Chainsaw Man (Fight Song / ファイトソング), and My Hero Academia (Bokura no / ぼくらの).

Career
He started his career on Japanese video-sharing service Niconico in October 2009. His first cover was released on Niconico on 1 October 2009, singing "TRAGIC BOY". Kurowa and Keitora were his previous names, before he began to use his current name.

From 2012 to 2013, Eve was the lead vocalist for the indie band Einie, along with Natsushiro Takaaki. Afterward, Eve was a member of "RIOT OF COLOR" in 2014.

Eve did not really see music as a path for him to take until 2016 after the release of Official Number. His first true try at creating an album afterward was named Bunka, which peaked at 14 and 33 on the Oricon Albums Chart and Billboard Japan Hot 100, respectively. His style of music was influenced by pop culture, such as movies.

He created a clothing store named Harapeco Store in 2016 and currently manages, designs, and sells unisex apparel and accessories. Eve also manages a second Store, named Eve Official Store, where he sells different types of merchandise, including clothing and accessories.

He created and published a manga, Kara no Kioku, illustrated by Newo, on 15 April 2020. The manga currently has 26 chapters, and a third volume is being created. As well as the manga, Eve is also writing a light novel, named How to Eat Life, which was announced on 1 August 2022, on Eve's Twitter page, before volume 1 was released on 22 September 2022. Volume 2 for the light novel was also being worked on. Volume 2 proceeded to be released on January 11th, 2023, with an attached announcement that Volume 1 of the Novel would be proceeding with a reprint. The announcement was made by MF BUNKO J, a novel publishing label, affiliated with Media Factory. 

Eve also streams on Twitcasting, which is similar to Twitch in many aspects.

Discography

Albums

Studio albums

Extended plays

Collaboration albums

Singles

Music videos

Awards and nominations

References

External links 

Living people
Vocaloid musicians
Japanese male singer-songwriters
Utaite
1995 births
Toy's Factory artists
J-pop singers
21st-century Japanese male singers